From Beale Street to Oblivion is the eighth full-length studio album by American rock band Clutch. It was produced by Joe Barresi (whose credits include The Melvins, Kyuss, Queens of the Stone Age and Coheed and Cambria), and released on the DRT Entertainment label. The album was released on March 20, 2007, and was the second of two Clutch albums to feature keyboardist Mick Schauer.

A reissue of the album was released on July 20, 2010, and Clutch re-released the album as a 2-LP set on purple vinyl, limited to 1,000 copies, for Record Store Day 2015.

Album description and reviews 
The album title comes from a line in the song "The Devil & Me", and is named after the real Beale Street in Memphis, Tennessee. The song "One Eye Dollar" is a remake of the same track from Jam Room. The track "Electric Worry" is a partial cover of the Muddy Waters song "Trouble No More"  and features Eric Oblander of Five Horse Johnson on harmonica. It also shares a striking similarity to "Boom Boom" by John Lee Hooker, even including the "Bang Bang Bang Bang" variation he would do live. A music video was produced for the track as well.

In his four-star review of the album for AllMusic, Greg Prato said "If you long for the days when Soundgarden were still a functioning band, Kyuss were still patrolling the desert, and Black Sabbath had yet to make up with Ozzy, Clutch will definitely not let you down with From Beale Street to Oblivion."

Writing for Blabbermouth, Keith Bergman said of the album, " — the band just cooks, with a live revival-tent intensity and more goddamn groove than you can possibly stand without involuntarily bouncing up and down in your chair. Clutch are carrying the flame for real American rock and roll, dumb rock for smart people, road warriors of the highest order and master artisans of the riff and the turn of phrase."

Track listing
All tracks written by Clutch, except where noted.

Original album

2010 deluxe reissue bonus CD listing
All tracks written by Clutch, except where noted.

Tracks 1–5 were recorded live at the BBC Maida Vale Studios on November 11, 2006, and tracks 6–9 were recorded on December 13, 2007, in Melbourne, Australia, during the tour for this album.

Personnel
Neil Fallon – vocals, rhythm guitar
Tim Sult – lead guitar
Dan Maines – bass
Jean-Paul Gaster – drums, percussion
Mick Schauer – Hammond B3, piano, Hohner Clavinet
Bryan Hinkley – guitar on tracks 4 and 12
Eric Oblander – Hohner harmonicas on tracks 6, 11 and 12

Production
 Produced, recorded and mixed by 'Evil' Joe Barresi at Sound City Studios, Van Nuys, California, and Bay 7, Valley Village, California
 Additional engineering by Pete Martinez
 Assistant engineering at Bay 7 by Glen Pittman
 Art and design by Nick Lakiotes
 Photography by Louis Rivera

Charts

References

External links
 Clutch official website
 "Electric Worry" (online stream)
 
kvltsite.com review

2007 albums
Clutch (band) albums
DRT Entertainment albums
Albums produced by Joe Barresi
Albums recorded at Sound City Studios